Girov is a commune in Neamț County, Western Moldavia, Romania.  It is composed of nine villages: Boțești, Căciulești, Dănești, Doina, Girov, Gura Văii, Popești, Turturești and Verșești. It also included Bălușești and Dochia villages from 1968 to 2003, when these were split off to form Dochia Commune.

Natives
 Nicolae Dăscălescu
 Ovidiu Marc

References

Communes in Neamț County
Localities in Western Moldavia